Philalanka is a genus of gastropods belonging to the family Charopidae.

The species of this genus are found in Southeastern Asia.

Species:

Philalanka anomphala 
Philalanka batuensis 
Philalanka bhutana 
Philalanka bidenticulata 
Philalanka bilirata 
Philalanka bismarckiana 
Philalanka bolampattiensis 
Philalanka camerunensis 
Philalanka carinifera 
Philalanka carinigera 
Philalanka circumsculpta 
Philalanka daghoba 
Philalanka delicata 
Philalanka depressa 
Philalanka depressispira 
Philalanka diminuta 
Philalanka edithae 
Philalanka febrilis 
Philalanka floweri 
Philalanka homfrayi 
Philalanka jambusanensis 
Philalanka kusana 
Philalanka lamcabensis 
Philalanka lieftincki 
Philalanka liratula 
Philalanka malimgunung 
Philalanka micromphala 
Philalanka moluensis 
Philalanka mononema 
Philalanka nannophya 
Philalanka notabilis 
Philalanka obscura 
Philalanka pirrieana 
Philalanka pusilla 
Philalanka quinquelirata 
Philalanka rugulosa 
Philalanka secessa 
Philalanka setifera 
Philalanka sinhila 
Philalanka subbilirata 
Philalanka tambunanensis 
Philalanka tertiana 
Philalanka thienemanni 
Philalanka thwaitesi 
Philalanka tjibodasensis 
Philalanka tricarinata 
Philalanka trifilosa

References

Gastropods